The Petrie Prize Lecture is an award given in alternate years by the Canadian Astronomical Society to an outstanding astrophysicist. The award commemorates the contributions to astrophysical research of the Canadian astronomer Robert M. Petrie.

Prize Winners
Source: Canadian Astronomical Society

 1970 Alastair G. W. Cameron
 1971 Jesse Leonard Greenstein
 1971 Carlyle Smith Beals
 1977 J. Beverley Oke
 1979 Geoffrey Burbidge
 1981 Hubert Reeves
 1983 M. J. Plavec
 1985 Charles Hard Townes
 1987 Henry Matthews
 1989 James Peebles
 1991 Peter B. Stetson
 1993 Maarten Schmidt
 1995 George Howard Herbig
 1997 Alexei Filippenko
 1999 Sidney van den Bergh
 2001 James E. Gunn
 2003 Martin Rees
 2005 Reinhard Genzel
 2007 Ewine van Dishoeck
 2009 Scott Tremaine
 2011 Andrew Fabian
 2013 Françoise Combes
 2015 Wendy Freedman
 2017 Charles A. Beichman
 2019 Gabriela Gonzalez

See also

 List of astronomy awards

References

External links
 website of the Canadian Astronomical Society for the R. M. Petrie Prize Lecture

Astronomy prizes
Canadian science and technology awards